Bogojci is a village in the municipality of Struga, North Macedonia.

Demographics
As of the 2021 census, Bogojci had 74 residents with the following ethnic composition:
Albanians 65
Persons for whom data are taken from administrative sources 8
Turks 1

According to the 2002 census, the village had a total of 170 inhabitants. Ethnic groups in the village include:

Albanians 167
Others 3

References

External links

Villages in Struga Municipality
Albanian communities in North Macedonia